Lhamo is a surname. Notable people with the surname include:

Khandro Lhamo (1914–2003), doctor of Tibetan medicine
Passang Lhamo, Tibetan nun, activist, and singer
Rinchen Lhamo (1901–1929), Tibetan writer
Sonam Lhamo (born 1988), Bhutanese actress
Tare Lhamo (1938–2002), Tibetan Buddhist master, visionary, and treasure revealer
Tsewang Lhamo (died 1812), queen of the Kingdom of Derge for eight years
Tsundue Pema Lhamo (1886–1922), first Queen consort of Bhutan
Yungchen Lhamo (born 1960s), Tibetan singer-songwriter living in the United States

Dzongkha-language surnames
Surnames of Bhutanese origin
Tibetan-language surnames
Surnames of Tibetan origin